Bilimono (also spelled Bilémona) is a town in north-eastern Ivory Coast. It is a sub-prefecture of Kong Department in Tchologo Region, Savanes District.

The far northern and eastern portions of the sub-prefecture are within the borders of Comoé National Park.

Bilimono was a commune until March 2012, when it became one of 1126 communes nationwide that were abolished.

In 2014, the population of the sub-prefecture of Bilimono was 19,873.

Villages
The 15 villages of the sub-prefecture of Bilimono and their population in 2014 are:

Notes

Sub-prefectures of Tchologo
Former communes of Ivory Coast